WZYZ (90.1 FM) is a radio station licensed to Spencer, Tennessee, United States. The station is currently owned by Church Faith Trinity Assemblies.

References

External links
 

ZYZ
Van Buren County, Tennessee